The Fédération Monégasque de Voile is the national governing body for the sport of sailing in Monaco, recognised by the International Sailing Federation. This organisation is in effect part of the Yacht Club de Monaco, which is the only Sailing Club in the country.

The new yacht club building for the Yacht Club de Monaco was designed by Foster and Partners and completed in 2014.

Famous Sailors
See :Category:Monegasque sailors

Olympic sailing
See :Category:Olympic sailors of Monaco

Offshore sailing
See :Category:Monegasque yacht racers

Yacht Clubs
See :Category:Yacht clubs in Monaco

References

External links

Monaco
Sailing
Sailing
Yacht clubs in Monaco
1985 establishments in Monaco